The fourth season of The Real Housewives of Potomac, an American reality television series, is broadcast on Bravo. It premiered on May 5, 2019, and is primarily filmed in Potomac, Maryland. Its executive producers are Steven Weinstock, Glenda Hersh, Lauren Eskelin, Lorraine Haughton-Lawson, Thomas Kelly and Andy Cohen.

The fourth season of The Real Housewives of Potomac focuses on the lives of Gizelle Bryant, Ashley Darby, Robyn Dixon, Karen Huger, Monique Samuels and Candiace Dillard.

The season was acclaimed by fans of the Bravo franchise with many fans deeming it one of the best seasons of Housewives of all time.

Cast and synopsis
All six housewives featured during the third season returned as housewives, with Katie Rost—who previously appeared as a housewife during the first season—returning in a recurring capacity.

Episodes

References

External links

 
 
 

The Real Housewives of Potomac
2019 American television seasons